The Great American Bathroom Book is a three-volume book series published in 1992, 1993 and 1994 (one volume each year) by Compact Classics. UK English versions of Vol. 1 and Vol. 2 were reprinted as Passing Time in the Loo by Scarab Book Limited.

Vol. 1
Published by Compact Classics, June 1992

Contents include: 
 Summaries of classic literature
 Biographies
 Business & Leadership
 Word Power
 Sports Summaries—How Games are Played
 Trivia
 Notable quotes from authors, religions, spirituality, dignitaries and other sources

Vol. 2
Published by Compact Classics, November 1993

Vol. 3
Published by Compact Classics, November 1994

Passing Time in the Loo
Published by Scarab Book Limited
Volume 1: 
Volume 2:
Volume 3:

Trivia books
Series of books